Mario de Armas (20 December 1915 – 19 December 1986) was a Cuban sports shooter. He competed in two events at the 1952 Summer Olympics.

References

1915 births
1986 deaths
Cuban male sport shooters
Olympic shooters of Cuba
Shooters at the 1952 Summer Olympics
Sportspeople from Havana
20th-century Cuban people